The following structures in Aurangabad circle of Maharashtra have been designated as Monuments of National Importance by the Archaeological Survey of India (ASI).

|}

See also
 List of State Protected Monuments in Maharashtra
 List of Monuments of National Importance in India

References 

Monuments of National Importance, Aurangabad
Aurangabad
Monuments of National Importance
Monuments and memorials in Maharashtra
Monuments of National Importance in Aurangabad circle
Monuments of National Importance in Aurangabad circle